Igor Kralevski (born 10 November 1978) is a Macedonian former footballer who played as a defender.

International career
He made his senior debut for Macedonia in a June 2005 FIFA World Cup qualification match away against Armenia and has earned a total of 3 caps, scoring no goals. His final international was a December 2010 friendly match against China.

References

External links
  Player page on the official Luch-Energiya website
 
 

1978 births
Living people
Footballers from Skopje
Association football defenders
Macedonian footballers
North Macedonia international footballers
FK Cementarnica 55 players
FK Makedonija Gjorče Petrov players
FK Rabotnički players
HNK Hajduk Split players
FC Luch Vladivostok players
FK Metalurg Skopje players
FK Teteks players
Macedonian First Football League players
Croatian Football League players
Russian Premier League players
Macedonian Second Football League players
Macedonian expatriate footballers
Expatriate footballers in Croatia
Macedonian expatriate sportspeople in Croatia
Expatriate footballers in Russia
Macedonian expatriate sportspeople in Russia